There have been multiple freeway revolts in Atlanta, Georgia. The longest and most famous examples of Interstate opposition were against I-485 and the Stone Mountain Freeway through Intown Atlanta, lasting over 30 years, from the early 1960s until the final construction of Freedom Parkway on a small portion of the contested routes in 1994.

I-485 and Stone Mountain Freeways

Location
The original plans for the Atlanta freeway system (map, p.2) included several freeways that were never built. 

 Georgia 400 would have continued south from its current terminus at I-85 near Lindbergh, through Morningside, Virginia-Highland, Poncey-Highland to Copenhill, the site of today's Carter Center (see detailed map of the route through Morningside and Virginia Highland)
 At Copenhill, there would have been an interchange with the east-west Stone Mountain Freeway
 The highway would have continued south roughly along Moreland Avenue, until the Perimeter, where it would have continued as today's I-675

Another was the east-west Stone Mountain Freeway, which:
 Would have begun in Downtown Atlanta and followed today's Freedom Parkway eastwards to Copenhill and the interchange with the north-south freeway
 Continued eastwards parallel to Ponce de Leon Avenue and Scott Boulevard until the northeast Perimeter, where it would have continued as today's Stone Mountain Freeway

Portions of the two highways were to bear the number I-485: the east-west highway from Downtown to Copenhill, and the north-south highway from Copenhill north to I-85.

Plans for new freeways

In 1964 the Georgia Highway Department (GHD) announced plans to build I-485. In May 1965, the Morningside Lenox Park Association (MLPA) was formed to fight the highway. MLPA hired planners who suggested an alternate route E, (map) roughly along the BeltLine from Ponce de Leon Avenue north to Ansley Mall and from there alongside Piedmont Road north to today's I-85/GA-400 interchange. In July 1965 a dueling civic association, the Morningside Monroe Civic Association (MMCA), was formed to fight Route E. In February 1966 the highway department definitively chose the original route (route B) through Morningside.

MLPA filed a lawsuit in October 1966 to try to stop construction and was denied; the appeal was denied in June 1967.

Success in stopping construction
Nonetheless the road was eventually stopped.
 During 1967–1970, the MLPA negotiated design changes with GHD, which bought time, and in 1971 another lawsuit was filed, this time via a PAC (neighborhood activists Virginia Taylor, Adele Northrup, Mary Davis, and Barbara Ray were instrumental in these efforts)
 National events creating momentum against further freeway construction in established residential areas:
 Congress passed the National Environmental Policy Act in 1969
 The Supreme Court ordered the Tennessee Department of Transportation (TDOT) to stop construction of Interstate 40 through a Memphis park
 From 1971–73 the Georgia DOT was headed by Carter's friend Bert Lance, who continued to fight for freeway construction and who would later be involved in scandal while serving as director of the OMB
 In Fall 1971 Virginia Highland residents led by Joseph Drolet founded the Virginia Highland Civic Association (VHCA) to fight the road, and a coalition was formed with residents of Inman Park and other neighborhoods
 In November 1971 the Atlanta Board of Aldermen rescinded their previous support for I-485 (Bert Lance appealed to them to reverse their stance); in June 1973 the aldermen strengthened their stance and passed a motion to actively oppose it
 In 1972 then-vice-mayor Maynard Jackson opposed the highway while running for mayor
 In March 1973 Governor Jimmy Carter signed a new city charter for Atlanta, including an "Environmental Bill of Rights" that Adele Northrup has authored; nonetheless Carter remained suspected of support for the freeway as late as August 1973.
 In June 1973 the federal DOT rejected the GHD's environmental impact study, citing its underassessment of impact on intown neighborhoods
 In 1975 Governor George Busbee instructed the GHD to remove I-485 from its long term plan – this was considered I-485's definitive death knell.

The result
The freeway revolt strengthened neighborhood organizations in Atlanta, which to this day exert relatively more influence in city decisions compared to other major US cities.

Portions of the right of way where houses had been razed were used for parks: Sidney Marcus Park in Morningside, John Howell Memorial Park in Virginia Highland, and Freedom Park at the current eastern terminus of Freedom Parkway.

The use of the north-south corridor for a road was a dead concept until GDOT brought it up again in 2010 in the form of a tunnel (see below); the discussion around a road in the east-west corridor was, however, to continue for another two decades.

Jimmy Carter's "Presidential Parkway"

The land that was to become the east-west freeway lay empty through the 1980s as residents fought the construction of any road in the corridor. A "Presidential Parkway" was proposed as a smaller four-lane road to run from Downtown far into Druid Hills  (see map).

Citizens of neighborhoods along the corridor formed CAUTION (Citizens Against Unnecessary Thoroughfares in Older Neighborhoods) to fight the proposed Presidential Parkway which would have been an elevated multi-lane highway with limited access.

In 1981, ex-President Carter revived the idea of a highway along the east-west route to serve his planned presidential library and policy center on Copenhill. Carter originally bought only several acres of land. However the GDOT leased him 29 more acres in exchange for backing GDOT plans for a 2.9 mile east-west expressway, on the condition that if the road were not built, the Center would lose the land, i.e. its parking and gardens. Carter lobbied and won support from Mayor Young, the City Council and Chamber of Commerce. The road would connect the new Carter Center with downtown on the west, and to Druid Hills (and thus access to Emory University) to the east. In 1984, Carter broke ground on the center, and construction resumed on the new "Presidential Parkway".

However, CAUTION lobbied until 1991 to fight the Jimmy Carter-backed Expressway. In the end, only Jimmy Carter and GDOT supported a "Presidential Parkway". CAUTION, Lieutenant Governor Pierre Howard (D-Decatur), Mayor Maynard Jackson, and a majority of councilpersons were opposed, as well as elected officials at the county, state and federal levels. Only the announcement that Atlanta would host the 1996 Olympics broke the stalemate. Court-ordered mediation between representatives of GDOT, the City of Atlanta and CAUTION, reached a mediated settlement to an at-grade, meandering parkway surrounded by parkland. In 1991, compromise forged by Lt. Governor Howard and DOT Commissioner Wayne Shackleford was reached to build the road as it exists today, and to the choice of the name "Freedom Parkway", in theory because it links the Carter Center with the Martin Luther King historic district.

During this time the term "Great Park" was also used to refer to the corridor.

Eventually the four-lane Freedom Parkway was built from Downtown to Copenhill only, ending in a northern stub to Ponce de Leon Avenue near Barnett in Virginia Highland, and an eastern stub to Moreland Avenue in Poncey Highland at the Druid Hills border. Largely due to the efforts of Druid Hills, Inman Park, Candler Park, Lake Claire and Poncey Highland residents, who filed a lawsuit, the right-of-way east of Moreland became a park but without a roadway.

In 1984 Steve Williams started documenting the Presidential Parkway as the construction started resulting in a show and a model built of Freedom Park in the City Hall Atrium after the compromise was reached in 1991. This show was supported by a grant by the City of Atlanta Bureau of Cultural Affairs and the Dept of Planning. More grants were awarded to support the work and other events were covered in the park such as Art in Freedom Park in 2005, a summer long arts festival of sculpture, music and performance and Naked Freedom 2003-2006 a naked frolic in the park. Other art created for the park is Decade: 1992 and 2002 are a series of photographs, with the original model of the park, sponsored by Don Bender showing the change of the land from 1992 to 2002  on display in the Point Center Building in Little 5 Points. Decades:1992, 2002, 2012 are on display through out Freedom Park showing the change from 1992 to present day at the site they were taken.

Eastern part of Lakewood Freeway/Langford Parkway
Langford Parkway, originally called the Lakewood Freeway (I-420) – now part of Georgia 166 – was to be built eastwards past its current terminus at the southern end of the Downtown Connector to connect to the north-south I-675 route, and then to meet I-20 near Gresham Park in south DeKalb (map of proposed route).

2010 plan for I-675
In 2010 a freeway to link GA-400 at Lindbergh with I-675 at the southeast Perimeter, again appeared on GDOT's list of potential projects, this time in the form whereby the intown portion would be in a 14.6-mile-long, 41-foot-wide tunnel. Rep. Pat Gardner held a meeting at Rock Springs Church in Morningside on January 4, 2010 with GDOT and Atlanta Regional Commission (ARC) leaders, Mayor Kasim Reed, city councilmembers and assemblypersons. ARC Chairman Tad Leithead, while still wishing to study the proposal, noted preliminary evidence of a funding gap, very high ($8) tolls and a shortfall in traffic lanes, making it appear that the project "doesn't make any sense". This elicited cheers from the audience. Mayor Reed expressed his total opposition to the tunnel.

The Reason Foundation has also advocated for such a tunnel paid as part of larger plan to reduce congestion via tolls.

References

External links
 Highway and transportation plan for Atlanta, Georgia,H. W. Lochner and Company; De Leuw, Cather & Company; Georgia. State Highway Dept. – original 1946 plan for Atlanta freeway system

I-485 and Stone Mountain Freeway
 "The Interstate that Almost Was", MLPA News, Fall 2003 – Detailed history of Morningside's fight against I-485
 The History of the Georgia State Road and Tollroad Authority

Presidential Parkway and Freedom Parkway
 Introduction to engineering By Paul H. Wright – Case study of the aftermath of the cancelled Stone Mountain Freeway through Intown Atlanta – the planned Presidential Parkway and resulting Freedom Parkway
 DRUID HILLS CIVIC ASSOCIATION, INC. v. The FEDERAL HIGHWAY ADMINISTRATION, United States Court of Appeals, Eleventh Circuit – Lawsuit against building the Presidential Parkway through Druid Hills
Stuart A. Rose Manuscript, Archives, and Rare Book Library, Emory University: Presidential Parkway (Atlanta, Ga.) opposition files, 1980-1992

New proposals for north-south tunnel
 "Reducing Congestion in Atlanta: A Bold New Approach to Increasing Mobility", The Galvin Mobility Project, By Robert W. Poole, Jr. – on p. 28–29, this 2006 study proposes a north-south tunnel along the former I-485 route

Anti-road protest
Druid Hills, Georgia
Old Fourth Ward
Protests in Georgia (U.S. state)
Urban renewal in Atlanta